Hub is a given name and a nickname, usually short for Hubert, Hubbard or Herbert. Notable people with the name include:

 Herbert Hub Andrews (1922–2012), American baseball pitcher
 Hubert Hub Anslow (1926–2006), Canadian ice hockey left winger
 Herb Hub Arkush (born 1953), American football sportscaster and analyst
 Hubert Hub Barker (1918–1994), American football linebacker
 Hubert Hub Bechtol (1926–2004), American footballer
 Hubert Hub Collins (1864–1892), American baseball player
 Hubert Hub van Doorne (1900–1979), Dutch businessman
 Hub Gray (died 2018), Canadian military officer and author
 James Henry Hub Hart (1878–1960), American Major League Baseball catcher
 Hubert Hub Kittle (1917–2004), American baseball pitcher, manager, and executive
 Oscar Hub Knolls (1883–1946), American baseball pitcher
 Herbert Hub McCormick (1878–1963), American college football player and military engineer
 Hubert Hub Nelson (1907–1981), American ice hockey player
 Hubbard Hub Northen (1886–1947), American Major League Baseball outfielder
 Herbert Hub Perdue (1882–1968), American baseball pitcher
 Henry Hub Pernoll (1888–1944), American baseball pitcher
 Hubert Hub Pruett (1900–1982), American baseball pitcher
 Hubert Hub Reed (born 1936), American basketball player
 Charles Hubby Hub Shoemake (1899–1984), American football player
 Hubert Hub Ulrich (1920–1974), American football player
 Hub Vinken (1926–2010), Dutch road cyclist
 Herbert Hub Wagner (1904–1992), American football coach
 Harvey Hub Walker (1906–1982), American baseball outfielder
 James Hubert Hub Wilson (1909–1999), Canadian ice hockey player

See also
 Hub (disambiguation)
 Hubby (disambiguation)

Masculine given names
Hypocorisms
Lists of people by nickname